Sierra de Segura is a mountain range of the Prebaetic System in the Jaén Province in Spain. It is named after the ancient town of Segura de la Sierra and it gives its name to the Segura River. Its highest point is the 1,993 m high Las Banderillas peak.

This mountain range is located between the Sierra Nevada, the Sierra de Cazorla and Sierra de Baza mountain ranges. It gives its name to the Sierra de Segura Comarca, an administrative division that includes a number of villages that are scattered across the range.

Protected area

The Sierras de Cazorla, Segura y Las Villas Natural Park is a protected area including about 80% of the Segura Range, as well as the neighboring Cazorla Range and some adjacent mountainous areas.

See also
Baetic System 
El Tranco de Beas Dam
Las Villas

References

External links 

 Parque Natural Sierras de Cazorla, Segura y Las Villas
 Turismo Activo en el Parque Natural de las Sierras de Cazorla, Segura y Las Villas

Segura
Baetic System